The 1980 Montana gubernatorial election took place on November 4, 1980. Incumbent Governor of Montana Thomas Lee Judge, who was first elected in 1972 and was re-elected in 1976, ran for re-election. He faced a stiff challenge in the Democratic primary from his lieutenant governor, Ted Schwinden, and he ultimately lost renomination. Schwinden, advancing to the general election, faced Jack Ramirez, the Minority Leader of the Montana House of Representatives and the Republican nominee. Although Ronald Reagan, the Republican presidential nominee, won the state in a landslide that year, Schwinden comfortably defeated Ramirez to win his first of two terms as governor.

Democratic primary

Candidates
Ted Schwinden, Lieutenant Governor of Montana
Thomas Lee Judge, incumbent Governor of Montana
Martin J. Beckman
Bob Kelleher, perennial candidate

Results

Republican primary

Candidates
Jack Ramirez, Minority Leader of the Montana House of Representatives
Al Bishop, Montana Fish and Game Commissioner
Florence Haegen, former Chairwoman of the Montana Republican Party

Results

General election

Results

References

Montana
Gubernatorial
1980